Biorhiza is a genus of gall wasps in the family Cynipidae in the tribe Cynipini: the oak gall wasp tribe. Cynipini is the tribe partially responsible for the formation of galls known as oak apples on oak trees. These are formed after the wasp lays eggs inside the leaf buds and the plant tissues swell as the larvae of the gall wasp develop inside.

Species
The genus includes the following species:

 Biorhiza mellea Ashmead, 1887
 Biorhiza pallida (Olivier 1791)

References

Hymenoptera genera
Cynipidae